The Presbyterian Church in Korea (HapDongBoSu IV.) is a Reformed Presbyterian denomination in South Korea. It adheres to the Apostles Creed and Westminster Confession of Faith. , it has 30,122 members and 127 congregations.

References 

Presbyterian denominations in South Korea
Presbyterian denominations in Asia